Naomi Price is an Australian stage actress and singer, best known for appearing in the fourth season of the Australian version of The Voice, finishing in fifth place, and her roles in original cabarets Rumour Has It: Sixty Minutes Inside Adele and Wrecking Ball

History 
Price moved from England to Australia to study at Queensland University of Technology in 2003. Since moving to Brisbane, she appeared in numerous productions including Matilda Women and Tashi Stories for QUT, Into the Woods, Children of Eden, Alice, The Awfully Big Adventures of Peter Pan, Rent, Tell Me on a Sunday and The Wishing Well for Matrix Theatre/La Boite Theatre. In 2007, Price played the role of Cathy in Jason Robert Brown's The Last Five Years co-starring The Voice Australia season 2 runner-up Luke Kennedy. She has performed alongside Guy Sebastian, Marina Prior, Troy Cassar-Daley and Broadway composer Scott Alan.

In August 2010 and June 2011, Price played Mary Magdalene in the critically acclaimed production of Jesus Christ Superstar at the Queensland Performing Arts Centre (QPAC) Playhouse.

Price founded the little red company with co-devisor Adam Brunes in 2012 and together they have created original cabarets Rumour Has It: Sixty Minutes Inside Adele and Wrecking Ball which have toured extensively around Australia. She recently made her debut with Queensland Theatre Company in their 2014 production of Gloria. Price also auditioned for season 4 of The Voice Australia. She was mentored by Ricky Martin throughout the series and placed 6th overall.
She is set to take part of the ensemble cast of a Carole King's hits-musical showcasing the US singer-songwriter's work, set to premiere in Brisbaneand. Price is an understudy for the role of Carole's friend and fellow songwriter Cynthia Weil.

Live performances

References

External links 
Harvest Rain launches 2010 Season
Australian Stage Online - Peter Pan
Harvest Rain moves to QPAC

Living people
Australian stage actresses
People from Shoreham-by-Sea
Queensland University of Technology alumni
Year of birth missing (living people)